Fratini is a surname. Notable people with the surname include:

 Renato Fratini (1932–1973), Italian commercial artist
 Renzo Fratini (born 1944), Italian Catholic bishop and diplomat
 Gina Fratini (1931–2017), British fashion designer
 Patrizia Fratini (born 1961), Italian gymnast